The Billboard Music Award for Top Gospel Album winners and nominees. This award was introduced in 2016.

Winners and nominees

References

Billboard awards
Album awards